Nana Opoku Agyemang-Prempeh (born 7 June 1989) commonly known as Agyemang Opoku, is a Ghanaian professional footballer who plays as an attacking midfielder.

Club career
Born in Obuasi, Ashanti, Opoku began his career at the AshantiGold Soccer Academy and was promoted to Ashanti Gold S.C. He left Ashanti Gold and moved to Tunisian side Club Sportif Sfaxien as a free agent in January 2007.

In December 2008, Opoku signed with Al Sadd of the Qatar Stars League. On 22 February 2011, he joined another Qatari club Al-Ahli on a three-month loan deal from Al Sadd.

Opoku signed a contract with Bulgarian side Levski Sofia during the summer of 2012 and made his official debut for the team on 26 July 2012, in a 1–3 away loss against FK Sarajevo in a UEFA Europa League match. His first and only game in the league was on 25 August 2012, in the 2–0 away win over Montana. The contract with Levski Sofia ended on 27 October 2012 due to injuries.

International career
Opoku played at the 2005 Africa under 17 Championships and was member of the Ghana national under-17 football team at 2005 FIFA U-17 World Championship in Peru. Opoku was also part of the Ghana national under-20 football team that won the 2009 FIFA U-20 World Cup in Egypt.

Honours
Sfaxien

 CAF Confederations Cup: 2008
Al Sadd

 Qatari Stars Cup: 2010
Ghana U-17
 African U-17 Championship runner up: 2005
Ghana U-20
 FIFA U-20 World Cup: 2009

Ghana
Africa Cup of Nations Silver Medal: 2010
Individual
 African U-17 Championship Top scorer: 2005

References

External links
 
 Profile at LevskiSofia.info

1989 births
Living people
People from Obuasi
Association football wingers
Association football forwards
Ghanaian footballers
Ghana under-20 international footballers
Ghana international footballers
2010 Africa Cup of Nations players
Ghanaian expatriate sportspeople in Tunisia
Expatriate footballers in Tunisia
Expatriate footballers in Qatar
Expatriate footballers in Bulgaria
Ashanti Gold SC players
CS Sfaxien players
Al Sadd SC players
PFC Levski Sofia players
Hapoel Kfar Saba F.C. players
Qatar Stars League players
First Professional Football League (Bulgaria) players
Al Ahli SC (Doha) players
Ghana youth international footballers